Drohobych Raion (translit: Drohobytskyi raion) is a raion (district) of Lviv Oblast (region) of western Ukraine. Its administrative center is Drohobych. Population: .

On 18 July 2020, as part of the administrative reform of Ukraine, the number of raions of Lviv Oblast was reduced to seven, and the area of Drohobych Raion was significantly expanded. Boryslav and Drohobych municipalities, as well as the city of Truskavets, which was previously incorporated as a city of oblast significance, were merged into Drohobych Raion. The January 2020 estimate of the raion population was

Subdivisions

Current
After the reform in July 2020, the raion consisted of 5 hromadas:
 Boryslav urban hromada with the administration in the city of Boryslav, transferred from Boryslav Municipality;
 Drohobych urban hromada with the administration in the city of Drohobych, transferred from Drohobych Municipality;
 Medenychi settlement hromada with the administration in the urban-type settlement of Medenychi, retained from Drohobych Raion;
 Skhidnytsia settlement hromada with the administration in the urban-type settlement of Skhidnytsia, transferred from Boryslav Municipality;
 Truskavets urban hromada with the administration in the city of Truskavets, transferred from the city of oblast significance of Truskavets.

Before 2020

Before the 2020 reform, the raion consisted of one hromada, Medenychi settlement hromada with the administration in Medenychi.

Settlements

There are 74 villages in Drohobych Raion. The villages of Drohobych Raion include:

Bolekhivtsi 
Bronytsia 
Verkhni Hai 
Verkhniy Dorozhiv 
Vynnyky 
Voloshcha
Voroblevychi
Hrushiv
Derezhychi
Drobrohostiv
Dobrivliany
Dovhe
Dolishnii Luzhok 
Zakolot
Zaluzhany
Ivana-Franka
Letnia
Litynia
Lishnia
Medvezha
Medenychi
Mykhailevychi
Modrychi
Mokriany
Nyzhni Hai 
Novyi Kropyvnyk 
Novoshychi
Opaka
Opory
Pidbuzh
Popeli
Pochaivychi 
Ranevychi
Ripchytsi
Rybnyk 
Rykhtychi
Roliv
Rivne
Selets
Smilna
Sniatynka
Solonske
Stare Selo
Staryi Kropyvnyk
Storona
Stupnytsia
Ulychne
Uniatychi
Urizh
Yasenytsia-Silna

See also
 Administrative divisions of Lviv Oblast

External links
 rajon.drohobych.com.ua - Official website of the Drohobych Raion
 Verkhovna Rada website - Administrative divisions of the Drohobych Raion

References

Raions of Lviv Oblast
1959 establishments in Ukraine